The New Zealand women's national 3x3 team is a national 3x3 basketball team of New Zealand, governed by Basketball New Zealand.

Competitions

3x3 World Cup

3x3 Asia Cup

Commonwealth Games

Honours

Medals table

Individual awards
 FIBA 3x3 Asia Cup MVP
 Micaela Cocks – 2018
 FIBA 3x3 Asia Cup All-Tournament Team
 Micaela Cocks – 2018

See also
 New Zealand men's national 3x3 team
 New Zealand women's national basketball team
 New Zealand men's national basketball team
 New Zealand women's national under-18 3x3 team

References

External links

Women's national 3x3 basketball teams
New Zealand women's national basketball team